D'Evereux Hall is a mansion in Natchez, Mississippi, listed on the National Register of Historic Places.

D’Evereux was built for William St. John Elliot, a wealthy plantation owner, and his wife Anna Conner.  The couple were social leaders in Natchez, and the home was named for Elliot's mother's family.

Completed in 1836, D’Evereux is one of the finest examples of Greek Revival architecture in the US.  The builders and architects are not known, though in the home's attic are the signatures of William Ledbetter of Virginia, and P.H. Hardy of Ohio.

D’Evereux was one of the first residential structures in Natchez built with a full-length two-story portico. The home included the first cupola in a Natchez mansion.

D’Evereux is currently a private residence, after being closed for many years it will be open for Spring Pilgrimage
.

Gallery

References

Houses on the National Register of Historic Places in Mississippi
Greek Revival houses in Mississippi
Houses completed in 1840
Houses in Natchez, Mississippi
National Register of Historic Places in Natchez, Mississippi